Donald Lewis may refer to:

 Donald John Lewis (1926–2015), American mathematician
 Donald Emerson Lewis (1930–1991), Canadian politician
 Donald Swain Lewis (1886–1916), British Army and Royal Flying Corps/Royal Air Force officer